Jayden Darren George Wareham (born 13 May 2003) is an English professional footballer who plays as a forward for  Premier League club Chelsea.

Career

Woking
Wareham started his career at Queens Park Rangers before he was released in 2019 and eventually joining National League side, Woking. After impressing for the under-18 and under-23 sides, he made his debut for The Cards in January 2020, during a 6–2 away defeat to Sutton United, replacing Jake Gray with four minutes remaining. Wareham played two more times in this campaign, and was also named the club's academy player of the year, before signing a new one-year contract with the Surrey-based side in October 2020. On 26 January 2021, he scored his first goals for the club coming off the bench to rescue a point in a 2–2 away draw against Bromley, netting in both the 72nd and 86th minute.

During his two-year spell at Woking, Wareham accolated twenty appearances to his name, scoring twice with both coming against Bromley, before earning himself a trial with Premier League side, Chelsea in March 2021.

Chelsea
Following a successful trial period, in which he featured three times, scoring once for the under-18 side, Wareham agreed a move to Chelsea in May 2021, signing a three-year deal. Upon his arrival he was placed into the under-23 side for the 2021–22 campaign and went onto feature twenty-seven times, finishing the season as the age group's top goal scorer with seven goals to his name, with notable goals coming in the EFL Trophy and the UEFA Youth League.

Loan to Leyton Orient
On 1 September 2022, Wareham joined EFL League Two side Leyton Orient on a season-long loan.

Career statistics

References

External links

2003 births
Living people
English footballers
Association football forwards
Queens Park Rangers F.C. players
Woking F.C. players
Chelsea F.C. players
Leyton Orient F.C. players
National League (English football) players